Giovanni Giuseppe Gilberto "Nanni" Galli (2 October 1940 – 12 October 2019) was an Italian saloon, sports-car and Formula One driver of the 1960s and 1970s.

Born in Bologna, Galli started his career in endurance racing. He won the Circuit of Mugello race in 1968 and finished second in the Targa Florio (with Ignazio Giunti) the same year. In the 1968 24 Hours of Le Mans, Galli and Giunti finished 4th in an Alfa Romeo T33/2. The following year at Le Mans, he shared a drive with Robin Widdows and they finished 7th in a Matra. Galli's final appearance at Le Mans was in 1970, where he shared a Alfa Romeo T33/3 with Rolf Stommelen. They did not finish.Galli moved briefly into Formula One in 1970, debuting in the 1970 Italian Grand Prix with a McLaren-Alfa, and had a handful of drives over the next couple of years, finishing 3rd in the non-championship Grand Prix of the Italian Republic at Vallelunga in 1972 for the small Tecno team.

His one shot at the big time came that year when he drove for Ferrari in the 1972 French Grand Prix at Circuit Charade near Clermont-Ferrand. Galli qualified 20th and finished only 13th. After half a dozen outings in an uncompetitive car for Frank Williams the following year, Galli announced his retirement.

Galli participated in 20 World Championship Grands Prix in total, scoring no championship points.

Galli died on 12 October 2019 in Prato at the age of 79.

Racing record

Complete British Saloon Car Championship results
(key) (Races in bold indicate pole position; races in italics indicate fastest lap.)

Complete Formula One World Championship results
(key)

References

Sources
Profile at www.grandprix.com

1940 births
2019 deaths
Sportspeople from Bologna
Italian racing drivers
Italian Formula One drivers
Ferrari Formula One drivers
March Formula One drivers
McLaren Formula One drivers
Tecno Formula One drivers
Williams Formula One drivers
European Formula Two Championship drivers
24 Hours of Le Mans drivers
World Sportscar Championship drivers